Péter Forgács (born 1950) is a media artist and independent filmmaker based in Budapest, Hungary. He is best known for his "Private Hungary" series of award winning films based on home movies from the 1930s and 1960s, which document ordinary lives that were soon to be ruptured by an extraordinary historical trauma that occurs off screen.

Biography
Since 1976 Péter Forgács has been active in the Hungarian art scene as media artist/filmmaker. In the late 1970s and '80s he collaborated with the contemporary music ensemble Group 180 , at the same time he started to work in the Béla Balázs Filmstudio. Forgács established the Private Photo & Film Archives Foundation (PPFA, 1983) in Budapest, a unique collection of amateur film footage from the '920, and has made this material "the raw data" for his unique postmodern re-orchestrations of history. 
In 2002 The Getty Research Institute held an exhibit The Danube Exodus: Rippling Currents of the River. His international debut came with the Bartos Family (1988), which was awarded the Grand Prix at the World Wide Video Festival in The Hague (1990). Since then Forgács has received several international festival awards in Budapest, Lisbon, Marseilles, San Francisco International Film Festival the Documentary Golden Gate Award 1998, Tribeca Film Festival 2005; At the Prix Europa, Berlin  received the European TV Documentary of the Year Award  1997. Forgács received the 2007 Erasmus Prize, which is "awarded to a person or institution which has made an exceptionally important contribution to culture in Europe." In 2009 Forgács represented Hungary at the Venice Biennale, exhibiting the Col Tempo - The W. Project installation. In 2013 Forgacs created the ″Letters to Afar″ video installation at Museum of the History of Polish Jews in Warsaw with The Klezmatics Group; and at EYE Netherlands Filmmuseum Amsterdam the ″Looming Fire - Stories from The Dutch East Indies 1900-1940″ installation.

Filmography

 2011 - GermanUnity@Balaton - Honeyland - produced by Lumen Film Amsterdam / Uj Budapest Film / for zdf/arte - HDCAM video 79 min.
 2009 - Video Active - documentary - for Video Active EU TV online archive promo - web version 10 min.
 2009 - Hunky Blues - The American Dream - produced by Filmpartners Ltd. - HD CAM 100 min.
 2008 - I am Von Höfler - Private Hungary 15 (video 160min)
 2007 - Own Death - fiction film - novel by Péter Nádas (video - 118min)
 2006 - Miss Universe 1929 - Lisl Goldarbeiter - a Queen in Wien (video - 70min) 
 2005 - El Perro Negro - Stories from the Spanish Civil War (video - 84min and 52min)
 2004 - Do You Really Love Me? (video - 33 min)
 2004 - Mutual Analysis (video - 12min)
 2003 - Der Kaiser auf dem Spaziergang - light & image project (DVD - 15'30min)
 2002 - The Bishop’s Garden - Private Hungary 14 (video - 56'30min)
 2001 - A Bibó Reader - Private Hungary 13 (35mm film and video - 69min)
 1999 - Angelos’ Film (video - 60min)
 1998 - The Danube Exodus (video - 60min) 
 1997 - The Maelstrom - A Family Chronic (video - 60’05min) 
 1997 - Kádár’s Kiss - Private Hungary 12 (video - 52min)
 1997 - Class Lot - Private Hungary 11 (video - 52min)
 1996 - Free Fall - Private Hungary 10 (video - 75min)
 1996 - The Land of Nothing - Private Hungary 9 (video - 62min)
 1994 - Meanwhile Somewhere 1940-43... (video - 52min)
 1994 - The Notes of a Lady - Private Hungary 8 (video - 48min)
 1994 - Hungarian Totem (video - 26min)
 1993 - Conversations on Psychoanalysis - documentary series 5/5
 1993 - Simply Happy - with Albert Wulffers (35mm film and video - 52min)
 1993 - Culture Shavings (video - 43min)
 1992 - Bourgeoisie Dictionary - Private Hungary 7 (video - 49min)
 1992 - Wittgenstein Tractatus - INTERLUDE series (video - 35min) 
 1991 - Arizona diary - with poet György Petri (video - 53min)
 1991 - Photographed by László Dudás - Private Hungary 6 (video - 45min)
 1991 - D-FILM - Private Hungary 5 (video - 45min)
 1991 - Márai Herbal - INTERLUDE series (video - 30min)
 1990 - The Diary of Mr. N. - Private Hungary 4 (video - 51min)
 1989 - Either - Or - Private Hungary 3 (video - 43min)
 1989 - Dusi & Jenő - Private Hungary 2 (video - 45min)
 1988 - The Bartos Family - Private Hungary 1 (video - 60min)
 1987 - Episodes from the Life of Professor M.F. (video - 110min)
 1986 - The Portrait of Leopold Szondi (video - 60min)
 1985 - Spinoza Rückwertz (35mm film - 5min)
 1978 - I See That I Look (video - 25min)

Installations and performances
 2013 - Forgacs created the ″Letters to Afar″ video installation at Museum of the History of Polish Jews, Warsaw with The Klezmatics Group; 
 2013 - ″Looming Fire - Stories from The Dutch East Indies 1900-1940″ installation. at EYE Netherlands Filmmuseum Amsterdam the 
 German Unity @ Balaton - Deutsche Einheit am Balaton – Die private Geschichte der deutsch-deutschen Einheit • media installation with Gusztav Hamos • Collegium Hungaricum Berlin • 2009 • Dortmund • 2010 • Vaszary Villa - Balatonfüred/Hungary • 2010 
 Col Tempo - The W. Project • installation • 53rd Venice Biennale • Hungarian Pavilion • curator András Rényi •  • 2009 •
 Black Hole • Performance, with Tamás Tóth bass guitar • 1984
 Case of My Room, The • video installation • 1994
 Chlorophyll • performance with L. Lugo Lugosi • 1986
 Danube Exodus, The • installation • 2002 
 Der Kaiser auf dem Spaziergang • video installation • Light and Image • Aegina • 1996
 Dixi & Pixi • video performance with Dixi, Group 180, L. Lugo Lugosi • 1982
 Dream Inventory • installation • 1995
 Free Fall • Oratorio • 1997
 Educational Cinema • installation • 2005
 Hung Aryan, The • Video Installation • 1997
 Hungarian Totem • installation • 1995 
 Hungarian Video Kitchen Art • video installation • 1991
 INAUGURATION • video performance • 1978
 Monomotapa & The Game (the "Kempelen" installation video - with György Jovánovics • 2007) Kunsthalle Budapest, ZKM-Karlsruhe
 New York - BUDAPEST • paintings-photos with L.Lugó Lugosi • 1984
 Paintings & photographs • One man show - Fotohof Salzburg • 1987
 Pig paintings • paintings • 1985
 Pre Morgue • video installation • 1993
 Private Exits • performance with Szemzõ • 1985
 Rembrandt Morphs • installation • 2006
 Saloon, and Then! • installation • 1997
 SIGHT • photo installation • 2004
 Snapshot from the Island • performance with Tibor Szemző • 1984
 Stanley & Livingston • performance • 1979
 Thee á' El Greco • video Installation • 1991
 Two Nests and Other Things • video installation • 1991
 Visit, The • installation • 2004
 Work Desk • video performance and installation with Tibor Szemzõ • 1985

Awards

 2020  Dragon of Dragons Award • Krakow Film Foundation, Krakow
 2009 	I am von Höfler • Hungarian Film Critics Special Award
 2008 	Own Death • Best Experimental Film Prize, 39th Hungarian Film Festival, Budapest
 2008 	I am von Höfler • Creative Documentary Film Prize, 39th Hungarian Film Festival, Budapest
 2007 	Erasmus Prize • Praemium Erasmianum Foundation, Amsterdam
 2006 	El perro negro • Documentary Film Grand Prize, 37th Hungarian Film Festival, Budapest
 2005 	El perro negro • The Maysles Brothers Documentary Film Grand Prize, Denver International Film Festival, USA
 2005 	El perro negro • Feature Length Documentary, Grand Prize, Tribeca International Film Festival, New York
 2001 	A Bibó Reader • Official selection Quinzaine des Réalisateurs, Cannes Film Festival, France
 2001 	A Bibó Reader • Best Director Prize of Short & Experimental Film, 33rd Hungarian Film Festival, Budapest
 2000 	Angelos' Film • Documentário Longa Grand Prize, XI Encotros Internacionalis De Cinema Documental, Portugal
 1999 	The Maelstrom • Grand Prize, Out of That Darkness International Film Competition, London
 1999 	Angelos' Film • Documentary Golden Gate Award, the Golden Spire, San Francisco International Film Festival, USA
 1999 	The Maelstrom • The Best Documentary Film Award, Jerusalem International Film Festival, Israel
 1999 	The Danube Exodus • Silver Dragon prix and FIPRESCI prize, Kraków Int. Doc. & Short Film Festival, Poland
 1999 	The Danube Exodus • Documentary Film Grand Prize, 30th Hungarian Film Festival, Budapest
 1998 	The Balázs Béla Film Award, Hungarian Republic, Budapest
 1999 	Free Fall • The Best Documentary-Fiction and the Best Film Music Prize, Hungarian Film Critics Prize, Budapest
 1997 	Free Fall • PRIX EUROPA, Best Non-Fiction Program of the Year, Berlin  
 1997 	Free Fall • Grand Prize & CNC "Image de la culture" special award, Marseilles International Document Film Festival, France
 1997 	Free Fall • Short & Experimental Film, Grand Prize, Budapest 28th Hungarian Film Festival, Budapest
 1995 	Meanwhile Somewhere • "Lattücht" Prize Dokument, ART 95 Festival, Neubrandenburg, Germany
 1994 	Wittgenstein Tractatus • Grand Prize, Montecattini, Terme, Italy
 1993 	Culture Shavings • St. Germaine de Geneva Prize, 5th Semaine Internationale de Video, Switzerland
 1993 	Wittgenstein Tractatus • Video Grand Prize, VIPER Film & Video Festival, Lucerne, Switzerland
 1993 	Wittgenstein Tractatus • Sound Base Arts Video Festival, Grand Prize, Wroclaw, Poland
 1992 	The Private Hungary series • Best Hungarian Documentary Film Prize, Hungarian Film Critics, Budapest
 1991 	Dusi and Jenő • Grand Prix, European Document Film Biennial, Marseilles, France
 1990 	The Bartos Family • Grand Prize, World Wide Video Festival, The Hague, Holland

Works in Public Collections

 Museum of Fine Art Budapest · Modern Collection·
 Australian Center for the Moving Image (ACMI) CINEMEDIA, Melbourne
 C3 Media Art Center, Budapest
 Centre National du Cinématographe, Paris
 Centre Pompidou & Musée d'Art Moderne, Paris
 Getty Museum, Special Collection, Los Angeles
 Harvard College Library, Cambridge, Massachusetts USA
 Haus der Dokumentarfilm collection, Stuttgart
 Hungarian National Gallery, Budapest
 KIASMA Contemporary Art Museum, Helsinki
 Ludwig Contemporary Art Museum, LUMU, Budapest
 Moffitt Library UC Berkeley, California USA
 MOMA, Film and Video collection, New York
 Montreal Cinematheque, Permanent Collection
 Museum of Fine Arts, 20th century Collection, Budapest
 Nederland Filmmuseum, Amsterdam
 New York University, Bobst Library NYU N.Y. USA
 Open Society Archive, CEU, Budapest
 Pacific Film Archives, Berkeley CA USA
 Samlung Oppenheim, Bonn
 Stanford University Library, Green Library, USA
 UIAH Helsinki University Art Department collection
 University of Southern California Film School - Annenberg Center for Communications, Los Angeles
 Yad Vashem, The Visual Center, Jerusalem
 Zentrum für Medien Kunst, ZKM collection, Karlsruhe

Secondary literature
*Cinema’s Alchemist. The Films of Péter Forgács, ed. by Bill Nichols and Michael Renov, Minneapolis, Minn.[etc.] : University of Minnesota Press, 2011

References

External links
 Official website of Peter Forgacs
 Hunky Blues - The American Dream film website
 Péter Forgács' exhibition at the 53rd Venice Biennale - Hungarian Pavilion
 the Col Tempo exhibition catalog
 The Danube Exodus - The Rippling Currents of the River - Installation video
 The Danube Exodus - The Rippling Current of the River
 Danube Exodus on P.F. website
 The Danube Exodus data website
 videos of Peter Forgacs
 Prix Europa 1997 FREE FALL  awarded
 Group 180
 Artist website
 Patricia Rebello & Rafael Sampaio, "Péter Forgacs - Arquitetura da Memória 2012" (Portuguese) 
 
 "Cinema's Alchemist: The Films of Peter Forgacs" (book), Visible Evidence
 https://archive.today/20140303102932/http://www.jewishmuseum.org.pl/en/event/letters-afar-may-18th-september-30th-2013

Hungarian film directors
1950 births
Living people
Hungarian contemporary artists